Michael Rosen (born 1946) is a British children's author and poet.

Michael Rosen may also refer to:
 Michael Rosen (mathematician) (born 1938), American mathematician
 Mike Rosen (born 1944), talk radio show host
 Michael Rosen (rabbi) (1945–2008), Israeli rabbi
 Michael E. Rosen (born 1952), philosopher and critic
 Michael J. Rosen (born 1954), American writer
 Michael Rosen (enterprise architect) (born 1956), American enterprise architect
 Michael Rosen (anaesthetist) (1927–2018), president of the Royal College of Anaesthetists
 Michael Rosen, former head chef of Signatures, Washington, D.C.
 Michael Rosen, guitarist and trumpeter in Mogul Thrash

See also
 Michael Rose (disambiguation)